The following is a list of international prime ministerial trips made by Jawaharlal Nehru during his tenure as the Prime Minister of India from 1947 to 1964.

List

See also
 List of international prime ministerial trips made by Indira Gandhi

Footnotes

Nehru administration
Nehru